Jane (Jean) Elmslie Henderson Findlay CBE (25 Dec 1885 – 20 March 1944). was a Scottish author and editor. She was secretary of the Scottish War Savings Committee during World War I, and an editor of Everyman magazine.

Early life 
Jean Henderson Findlay was born in Aberdeen, Scotland, the daughter of Aberdeen hat merchant George Findlay and Jane Elmslie Henderson. Her father died in May 1885, seven months before her birth; her mother died in early January 1886, two weeks after giving birth. In a court case later that year, to claim a third of her father's estate, her curator at litem was Harry Cheyne; the claim was repelled.

Career 
In 1914, Findlay began writing a contributor to the journal Everyman, and was a war correspondent from Flanders. She published a translation of Pierre Nothomb's The Barbarians in Belgium, and made a lecture tour of Canada in 1915, to raise funds for war relief in Belgium. For her efforts, she received the Queen Elisabeth Medal from the Belgian government. 

Findlay was acting editor of Everyman from 1915 to 1917. In 1918, her translation of Émile Vandervelde's Three Aspects of the Russian Revolution was published. From 1916 to 1923, she was director of the Scottish War Savings Committee. She was made a Commander of the Order of the British Empire (CBE) in 1920, for her contributions to the war effort. 

In 1926, she became the first Viscountess Dunedin, when her husband became a Viscount. She spoke at a meeting of the Manchester Publicity Association in 1930, on the limitations of advertising. Also in 1930, she traveled with her husband to visit Freeman Freeman-Thomas, the Governor-General of Canada, and attend meetings of the Canadian Bar Association and American Bar Association. She returned to the editor's position at Everyman for a year, from 1933 to 1934.

Personal life 
In 1923, Jean Henderson Findlay married widower Andrew Graham Murray, 1st Viscount Dunedin, a Scottish politician, and judge, as his second spouse. They had no children and the title died with their deaths. Jean Henderson Findlay was widowed when Murray died in 1942, and she died from cancer in London in 1944, aged 58 years.

References

External links 

 The National Portrait Gallery holds seven Bassano portraits of Jane Elmslie Henderson Murray (née Findlay), Viscountess Dunedin.
 A 1929 portrait of Jane Murray, Viscountess Dunedin, by Philip Alexius de László, in the collection of the Aberdeen Art Gallery and Museums.

People from Aberdeen
Scottish writers
1885 births
1944 deaths
Scottish editors
Scottish women writers
Scottish women editors
British women in World War I
Commanders of the Order of the British Empire
Dunedin
War correspondents of World War I
Writers from Aberdeen